Ambla Vallameeskond is an Estonian football club based in Ambla. Founded in 2010, they currently play in the III Liiga, the fifth tier of Estonian football. Ambla Vallameeskond is the reserve team of Estonian football club Rakvere JK Tarvas and it has a reserve team Rakvere JK Tarvas II.

Players

Current squad
 ''As of 17 June 2017.

Statistics

League and Cup

References

Järva Parish
Football clubs in Estonia
Association football clubs established in 2010